Rear Admiral William Caldwell (died 1718) was a Royal Navy officer who briefly served as Commander-in-Chief, The Thames from 12 November 1717 to 1 December 1717.

Naval career
Promoted to captain in January 1694, Caldwell commanded, successively, the sixth-rate , the sixth-rate , the fourth-rate , the fourth-rate , the forth-rate , the third-rate  and the third-rate . He saw action at the battle of Málaga in August 1704 and briefly served as Commander-in-Chief, The Thames from 12 November 1717 to 1 December 1717.

Caldwell married Catherine Nanfan, daughter of Bridges Nanfan of Birtsmorton Court in 1702. After his death in 1718, a memorial to Caldwell was erected in the church at Birtsmorton in Worcestershire.

References

1718 deaths
Royal Navy rear admirals